The AAA World Mixed Tag Team Championship (Campeonato en Parejas Mixtas AAA in Spanish) is a tag team title contested for in the Mexican lucha libre promotion Lucha Libre AAA Worldwide (AAA). The championship is exclusively for teams composed of one male wrestler and one female wrestler. The current champions are Abismo Negro Jr. and Flammer. 

Abismo Negro Jr. and Flammer  are the current champions, defeating Komander and Sexy Star II and Octagón Jr. and Lady Shani in a Three-way mixed tag team match for the vacant titles after previous champions Jericho Appreciation Society (Tay Melo and Sammy Guevara were stripped of the titles, due to Melo working a match on the same night on AEW Dynamite. There have been 17 reigns between 16 teams composed of 27 individual champions, and three vacancy. The sibling team of Cynthia Moreno and El Oriental is the only team to have held the title twice, The shortest title reign belongs to La Legión Extranjera (Alex Koslov and Christina Von Eerie), at 91 days. Faby Apache is the only individual to have held the title four times, but with different partners.

2005 Mixed Tag Team Championship tournament
The tournament ran took place on December 10, 2005 during Guerra de Titanes.

Title history

Combined reigns

By team

By wrestler

Notes

References

External links
AAA's official title history

Lucha Libre AAA Worldwide championships
Tag team wrestling championships
Women's professional wrestling tag team championships